Marco Tulio may refer to:

 Marco Túlio (footballer, born 1981), Brazilian football midfielder
 Marco Túlio (footballer, born March 1998), Brazilian football midfielder
 Marco Túlio (footballer, born May 1998), Brazilian football left-back
 Marco Túlio, Brazilian musician, guitarist for Jota Quest

See also
 Marcos Túlio (born 1992), Brazilian football defensive midfielder